R2K is the tenth studio album by Filipino singer-actress Regine Velasquez, released on November 24, 1999, by Viva Records in the Philippines in CD and cassette format and later as a digital download. The album is Velasquez's second from Viva Music Corporation after Drawn. It consists of various covers of hits from the 1980s such as Jeffrey Osborne's "On the Wings of Love" to the 1990s such as Aerosmith's "I Don't Want to Miss a Thing". The album was produced by Velasquez and sold more than 40,000 copies in its second week of release, earning a platinum certification, and was certified four times platinum a year later. R2K has since been certified twelve times platinum, becoming the highest-selling album by a female artist in the Philippines.

Background
R2K is Velasquez' third all-covers album after Tagala Talaga and Retro. She also featured actor Gabby Eigenmann and MTV Pilipinas VJ KC Montero to do a rap adlib for her song "For the Love of You". It also marked the first time a Philippine artist released an album with a VCD. The VCD contains six music videos done by Velasquez with director Louie Ignacio including "One Love" which features actors Antoinette Taus and Dingdong Dantes. It is also the first time in the Philippines that a limited edition 48-page colored magazine was released together with the album.

Release and promotion

As part of the album's promotion, Velasquez performed in small venue tours which included a three-date event at the Music Museum called Regine 2000. In January, it was reported that an arena concert was planned in support of the album. Shortly after, it was announced that Velasquez would perform two shows on April 7–8, 2000 at the Araneta Coliseum, officially named R2K: The Concert. Velasquez and her team selected Ogie Alcasid, Gabby Eigenmann, Janno Gibbs, Jaya, and KC Montero as special guests. The concerts received generally positive reviews from music critics, who praised Velasquez's performances, as well as the stage production. She garnered a Best Female Major Concert Act win at the Aliw Awards for the show.

Track listing

Credits are adapted from the liner notes of R2K.

* "Love Songs Medley" is not included in the cassette format of the album.

Charts and certifications

See also
 Regine Velasquez discography
 List of best-selling albums in the Philippines

References

Regine Velasquez albums
1999 albums
Covers albums